CPD in the context of NCETM means Collaborative Professional Development (not "Continuing Professional Development" as in some other contexts).

The essence of "Collaborative" is that teachers work in groups and develop skills together. Thus it is an _ongoing_relationship - just as a pet is "not just for Christmas", so CPD is "not just for one day" but is continuing AND collaborative.

CPD also has elements of inter-colleague support, and of 'cascading' within a learning institution. It derives professional skills as socially constructed, and not learned via didactics.

Informal, versus formal, collaboration can be more effective for all, due to the Professional Trust embodied by the informal and non-directed nature of the work. Teachmeets are an example of this unmanaged unconference phenomena.

Personal development